Amir Edri (Hebrew: אמיר אדרי), (born July 26, 1985) is an Israeli goalkeeper. After a loan spell with Maccabi Herzliya in the 2007/08 season, Edri returned to Haifa and played 11 games after the first-string 'keeper was injured.

Honours
Israeli Premier League (2):
2008–09, 2010–11

References

1985 births
Living people
Israeli Jews
Israeli footballers
Maccabi Haifa F.C. players
Maccabi Herzliya F.C. players
Maccabi Netanya F.C. players
Israeli Premier League players
Israeli people of Moroccan-Jewish descent
People from Or Akiva
Association football goalkeepers